The Miss Nevada competition is the pageant that selects the representative for the state of Nevada in the Miss America competition, and the name of the title held by that winner. The first Nevadan to compete at Miss America was Carol Lampe in 1949.

The competition currently takes place in South Lake Tahoe. Other venues have included Reno, Elko, Las Vegas, Carson City and Mesquite.  It has at various times been hosted by the Reno Lions Club and the Soroptimist club of Nevada.

Heather Renner of Reno was crowned Miss Nevada 2022 on July 2, 2022 at the Bally’s Lake Tahoe in South Lake Tahoe. She competed for the title of Miss America 2023 at the Mohegan Sun in Uncasville, Connecticut in December 2022 where she placed in the Top 7 and won the Equity & Justice Award.

Results summary
The following is a visual summary of the past results of Miss Nevada titleholders at the national Miss America pageants/competitions. The year in parentheses indicates the year of the national competition during which a placement and/or award was garnered, not the year attached to the contestant's state title.

Placements
 2nd runners-up: Stacie James (1988)
 3rd runners-up:  Teresa Benitez (2003)
 Top 7: Heather Renner (2023)
 Top 10: Loni Gravelle (1958), Cheryle Thompson (1964), Joan Burachio (1972)
 Top 16: Tosca Masini (1951)

Awards

Preliminary awards
 Preliminary Interview: Teresa Benitez (2003)
 Preliminary Lifestyle and Fitness: Kathryn Blaikie (1966), Gina Giacinto (2000) 
 Preliminary Talent: Stacie James (1988)

Non-finalist awards
 Non-finalist Interview: Elizabeth Muto (2005)
 Non-finalist Talent: Vicky Jo Todd (1971), Helen Bennett (1973), Sandra Kastel (1977), Megan Anderson (1979), Sonja Nall (1986), Jennifer Joseph-Lier (1996), Tiffanie Story (2001), Ellie Smith (2015)

Other awards
 Equity & Justice Winners: Heather Renner (2023)
 Overall Interview Award: Teresa Benitez (2003)
 Quality of Life Award Winners:  Teresa Benitez (2003), Caleche Manos (2008)
 Quality of Life Award 2nd runners-up: Elizabeth Muto (2005), Christina Keegan (2010)
 Quality of Life Award/Social Impact Initiative Scholarship Finalists: Bailey Gumm (2017), Nasya Mancini (2020)
 STEM Scholarship Award Winners: Alexis Hilts (2019)
 STEM Scholarship Award Finalists: Katherine Kelley (2016), Andrea Martinez (2018)

Winners

References

External links
 

Nevada
Nevada culture
Women in Nevada
1949 establishments in Nevada
Recurring events established in 1949
Annual events in Nevada